Diasporus citrinobapheus, or yellow dyer rainfrog, is a species of frogs native to the Cordillera de Talamanca of western Panama. It was first described in 2012.

The specific name citrinobapheus is derived from the Greek citrinos (citrin-yellow) and bapheus (dyer) referring to the yellow body color that dyes one's fingers yellowish when the frog is handled.

References

External links

citrinobapheus
Endemic fauna of Panama
Amphibians of Panama
Frogs of South America
Amphibians described in 2012